"Where Did We Go Wrong" is a song by American recording artists Toni Braxton and Babyface. It was written by Braxton and Babyface for their collaborative studio album Love, Marriage & Divorce (2014), while production was helmed by latter. The song was released on December 17, 2013 as the second single from the album. "Where Did We Go Wrong" peaked at number 11 on the US Adult R&B Songs and was ranked 38th on the chart's year-end listing.

Commercial performance
"Where Did We Go Wrong" peaked at number 11 on the US Adult R&B Songs on May 3, 2014, and entered the top 40 of the R&B/Hip-Hop Airplay chart. Billboard ranked the song 38th on the 2014 Adult R&B Songs year-end chart.

Promotion
Braxton and Babyface performed "Where Did We Go Wrong" on American morning television show Good Morning America on July 2, 2014.

Credits and personnel 
Credits adapted from the liner notes of Love, Marriage & Divorce.

Paul Boutin – mixing, recording
Toni Braxton – vocals, writer
Antonio Dixon – percussion
Kenneth "Babyface" Edmonds – bass, guitar, producer, vocals, writer

Charts

Weekly charts

Year-end charts

References

2013 singles
Toni Braxton songs
Songs written by Toni Braxton
Contemporary R&B ballads
2013 songs
Songs written by Babyface (musician)
Motown singles
Song recordings produced by Babyface (musician)
Babyface (musician) songs
Male–female vocal duets